Teshome Toga Chanaka (born 23 April 1968) is an Ethiopian politician and second Speaker of the House of Peoples' Representatives, the lower chamber of the Ethiopian Parliament, from 2005 to 2010. He was succeeded by Abadula Gemeda.

Background

Early life 
Teshome was born in Dimtu, Ethiopia, and completed his primary education in Bilate Tena Primary school. He was born into a farmer family, and used to help his family after school: by herding cattle and plowing. Teshome completed his secondary school in Sodo. After completing his secondary education, he attended Addis Ababa University in 1987.

Political career 
Teshome has worked in different levels of power from district to regional level in Southern Nations, Nationalities, and Peoples' Region, before becoming the Speaker of the House of Peoples' Representatives. Most of his governmental positions were being an ambassador of Ethiopia in different counties. Being stationed in Ghana (1992–93), Egypt (1993-1996), Kenya and Tanzania (1996-2001), Belgium (2013-2019), and currently in China (2019-)

References 

Living people
Wolayita
20th-century Ethiopian politicians
Speakers of the House of Peoples' Representatives (Ethiopia)
People from Wolayita Zone
1968 births
21st-century Ethiopian politicians